General Sir Arthur Borton  (20 January 1814 – 7 September 1893) was a British Army officer who became Governor of Malta.

Early life

Borton was born on 20 January 1814 in Blofield, Norfolk where his father John Drew Borton was the rector. His mother was Louisa Carthew one of the daughters of Rev Thomas Carthew of Woodbridge Abbey in Suffolk. He was educated at Eton College and the Military College, Sandhurst.

Confederate soldier Collett Leventhorpe was his kinsman.

Military career

Borton was commissioned into the 9th (East Norfolk) Regiment of Foot in 1832. He took part in the First Anglo-Sikh War in 1845 and in 1854–55 he commanded the regiment at the siege of Sevastopol during the Crimean War. He became commander of an infantry brigade at the Curragh in Ireland in 1866 and General Officer Commanding the Mysore division of the Madras Army in 1870. Promoted to full general in 1877, he became Governor of Malta in 1878 before retiring in June 1884.

Borton was Colonel of the 1st West India Regiment from 1876 to 1888 and Colonel of the Norfolk Regiment from 1889 to 1893.

He died, on 7 September 1893 at his residence, 105 Eaton Place, London, and was buried on 9 September at Hunton, near Maidstone, Kent.

Family life
Borton married Caroline Mary Georgina Close in 1850, daughter of Rev John Forbes Close of Morne, County Down. They had two sons: Arthur Close Barton, lieutenant-colonel Somerset Light Infantry, father of lieutenant colonel Arthur Drummond Borton VC and air vice-marshal Amyas Eden Borton, and Charles Edward Borton, lieutenant-colonel in the Norfolk Regiment, who served in the Second Anglo-Afghan War and the Second Boer War.

References

External links 
 Guide to the Borton Family Papers 

1814 births
1893 deaths
Knights Grand Cross of the Order of the Bath
Knights Grand Cross of the Order of St Michael and St George
British Army generals
Graduates of the Royal Military College, Sandhurst
People from Blofield
Chevaliers of the Légion d'honneur
Recipients of the Order of the Medjidie, 3rd class
Governors and Governors-General of Malta